Kamil Tvrdek (born September 9, 1983) is a Czech former professional ice hockey left winger.

Tvrdek played a total of 84 games in the Czech Extraliga for HC Karlovy Vary, from 2001 to 2008. He also played in the Slovak Extraliga for MsHK Žilina and the MOL Liga for Ferencvárosi TC.

References

External links

1983 births
Living people
HC Baník Sokolov players
Bracknell Bees players
Czech ice hockey left wingers
Ferencvárosi TC (ice hockey) players
Sportovní Klub Kadaň players
HC Karlovy Vary players
Milton Keynes Lightning players
HC Most players
Slough Jets players
Sportspeople from Karlovy Vary
HC Vrchlabí players
MsHK Žilina players
Expatriate ice hockey players in England
Expatriate ice hockey players in Hungary
Czech expatriate sportspeople in Hungary
Czech expatriate sportspeople in England
Czech expatriate ice hockey players in Slovakia